Alexandre Avez (16 June 1858, Saint-Quentin, Aisne - 12 January 1896) was a French politician. He belonged to the Revolutionary Socialist Workers' Party (POSR). He was a member of the Chamber of Representatives from 1893 to 1896.

References

1858 births
1896 deaths
People from Saint-Quentin, Aisne
Politicians from Hauts-de-France
Revolutionary Socialist Workers' Party (France) politicians
Members of the 6th Chamber of Deputies of the French Third Republic